Dubrova is a small hamlet north of Labin in Istria County, Croatia. There in the hamlet was the large estate of the Baron Lazzarini. To the north a larger settlement called stermatz (Strmac) and to the south Stari-Grad.

References

Populated places in Istria County
Labinština